Dânia Neto is a Portuguese actress. Born in Loulé, in Algarve region, and primarily a model, she initiated her career through several spots advertising executives and became popular with her works in television, participating in soap operas and series such as Maré Alta (2004), Morangos com Açúcar (2005), Camilo em Sarilhos (2005), Mundo Meu (2006), Tempo de Viver (2006) and Laços de Sangue (2010).

References

External links
 

1983 births
Living people
Portuguese television actresses
People from Loulé
Portuguese actresses